Sad Fairy Tale (Chinese: 傷心童話) is a 2012 Chinese-South Korean romantic comedy film directed by Zhengchao Xu. The story is adapted from true events in the life of Wang Xiao Yi(汪小一）, friend of the director.

Summary

Yang Jia is harassed by her superior at work. Liu Tong, a co-worker and previous classmate of hers, loves her quietly. He never confesses to her but he joined the company as a programmer to be close to Yang Jia. Yang Jia is aware of the support Liu Tong gives her, but she only ever confesses in the pages of her diary.  Yang Jia contracts a rare disease that no one has ever recovered from.  Liu Tong does all that he can to make her dreams come true, literally.

Cast
 Cecilia Liu as Yang Jia
 Xu Zhengchao as Qin
 Ryan Dazuo as Yin Zhe
 Iola Xie as Yue Ling
 Hu Xia as Liu Tong

References

External links

Chinese romantic comedy films
2012 romantic comedy films
2012 films
South Korean romantic comedy films
2010s South Korean films